Futsal at the 2005 Asian Indoor Games was held in Bangkok, Thailand from 10 November to 17 November 2005.

Medalists

Medal table

Results

Men

Preliminary round

Group A

Group B

Group C

Knockout round

Quarterfinals

Semifinals

3rd place

Final

Women

Preliminary round

Final round

3rd place

Final

References

 RSSSF
 futsalplanet
 thaifootball

2005 Asian Indoor Games events
Indoor Games
2005
2005